Mohammadabad-e Sofla (also Romanized as Moḩammadābād-e Soflá; also known as Moḩammadābād-e Kalāntar, Moḩammadābād-e Pā’īn, Moḩammadābād Kalāntar, and Moḩammadābād Pā’īn) is a village in Esmaili Rural District, Esmaili District, Anbarabad County, Kerman Province, Iran. At the 2006 census, its population was 167, in 37 families.

References 

Populated places in Anbarabad County